
This is a list of unmade and unreleased animated projects by 20th Century Studios. Some of these films and shows were, or still are, in development limbo. These also include the co-productions the studio collaborated with in the past (i.e. 20th Century Animation, Fox Animation Studios, Blue Sky Studios, DreamWorks Animation, 20th Television Animation, and Locksmith Animation), as well as sequels to their franchises.

1990s

1991

1992

1993

1994

1995

1998

1999

2000s

2000

2001

2003

2006

2008

2009

2010s

2010

2011

2012

2013

2014

2015

2016

2017

2018

See also
 List of unproduced Disney animated projects
 List of unproduced DreamWorks Animation projects
 List of unproduced film projects based on Marvel Comics
 List of unproduced films based on Marvel Comics imprints publications
 List of unproduced 20th Century Fox projects based on Marvel Comics
 List of unproduced Warner Bros. Animation projects
 List of unproduced Sony Pictures Animation projects
 List of unproduced Universal Pictures animated projects

References

20th Century Fox Animation
20th Century Animation
20th Century Fox Animation
20th Century Fox Animation
20th Century Fox Animation
Unreleased 20th Century Fox
Fox animation